George Bowers may refer to:
George Bower (medallist) (fl. 1664–1689), also written Bowers
George Bowers (priest) (1794–1872), Anglican Dean of Manchester
George Meade Bowers (1863–1925), American politician
George Bowers (filmmaker) (1944–2012), director of Private Resort
George B. Bowers (1878–1944), served in the California legislature
George Newell Bowers (1849–1909), American painter